G. maritima may refer to:
 Geositta maritima, the greyish miner, a bird species found in Chile and Peru
 Glaux maritima, a flowering plant species

See also
 Maritima (disambiguation)